The AFI Docs (formerly Silverdocs) documentary film festival is an American international film festival created by the American Film Institute and the Discovery Channel. It is held every year in Silver Spring, Maryland and Washington, D.C. Started in 2003, the festival is held for five days in June at the AFI Silver Theatre as well as several locations in Washington, D.C.

Notable participants

 AOL vice-chairman emeritus Ted Leonsis, 
 BET co-founder Sheila Johnson, 
 Former Vice President Al Gore, 
 Academy Award-winning film makers:
Martin Scorsese, 
 Jonathan Demme,
 Barbara Kopple,
Alex Gibney 
 LeBron James

Yoruba Richen won the Audience Award in 2013 for The New Black, her documentary was about the African-American community response to marriage equality initiatives.

Participating organizations
There are several organizations that usually take part on the events: BBC, CPB, Discovery Channel, TLC, Animal Planet, The Ford Foundation, HBO, Latino Public Broadcasting, John D. and Catherine T. MacArthur Foundation, Miramax,  National Black Programming Consortium, National Geographic, PBS, the Sundance Institute, The Weinstein Company.

Advisory board
The AFI Docs Advisory Board includes: Ken Burns, Davis Guggenheim, Chris Hegedus, Werner Herzog, Barbara Kopple, Spike Lee, Albert Maysles, Errol Morris, D A Pennebaker, and Frederick Wiseman.

References

External links
Silverdocs Award Winners (via UC Berkeley)
Official website
Info about AFI

Downtown Silver Spring, Maryland
Film festivals in Maryland
Tourist attractions in Montgomery County, Maryland
Documentary film festivals in the United States
American Film Institute
Film festivals in Washington, D.C.

Film festivals established in 2003